The Sudamericano de Futsal Sub-17 (South American Under-17 Futsal Championship), also known as CONMEBOL Sub17 Futsal, is the U-17 version of Copa América de Futsal.

The second edition held in 2018 was an under-18 competition to decide the qualifiers for the 2018 Youth Olympic Futsal Tournament.

Champions by year

Medal Count

References

External links
Sudamericano Sub17 de Futsal Brasil 2016
Sudamericano Sub 18 de Futsal Paraguay 2018

Futsal competitions in South America
CONMEBOL competitions
South American youth sports competitions